The 1998 Kremlin Cup was a tennis tournament played on indoor carpet courts at the Olympic Stadium in Moscow in Russia that was part of the World Series of the 1998 ATP Tour and of Tier I of the 1998 WTA Tour. The men's tournament was held from 9 November through 15 November 1998, while the women's tournament was held from 20 October through 25 October 1998. Yevgeny Kafelnikov and Mary Pierce won the singles title.

Finals

Men's singles

 Yevgeny Kafelnikov defeated  Goran Ivanišević 7–6(7–2), 7–6(7–5)
 It was Kafelnikov's 3rd title of the year and the 17th of his career.

Women's singles

 Mary Pierce defeated  Monica Seles 7–6(7–2), 6–3
 It was Pierce's 3rd title of the year and the 11th of her career.

Men's doubles

 Jared Palmer /  Jeff Tarango defeated  Yevgeny Kafelnikov /  Daniel Vacek 6–4, 6–7, 6–2
 It was Palmer's only title of the year and the 11th of his career. It was Tarango's only title of the year and the 6th of his career.

Women's doubles

 Mary Pierce /  Natasha Zvereva defeated  Lisa Raymond /  Rennae Stubbs 6–3, 6–4
 It was Pierce's 2nd title of the year and the 5th of her career. It was Zvereva's 7th title of the year and the 77th of her career.

External links
 Official website 
 Official website 
 ATP tournament profile
 WTA tournament profile

Kremlin Cup
Kremlin Cup
Kremlin Cup
Kremlin Cup
Kremlin Cup
Kremlin Cup
Kremlin Cup